Mangohick is an unincorporated community in King William County, Virginia, United States.  Mangohick Church, located within the community, is listed on the National Register of Historic Places.

References

Unincorporated communities in Virginia
Unincorporated communities in King William County, Virginia